Razak Cabinet is the name of either of two cabinets of Malaysia:
Cabinet Razak I (1970–1974)
Cabinet Razak II (1974–1976)